James Earl Collins (November 24, 1946 – December 13, 2020) was an American basketball player and coach. He was born and raised in Syracuse, New York, where he attended Corcoran High School. Collins was the head coach of the men's basketball team at the University of Illinois at Chicago from 1996 to 2010, becoming the program's all-time winningest coach and leading UIC to its first-ever postseason appearances - NCAA tournament appearances in 1998, 2002 and 2004, and an NIT showing in 2003.

Early life and playing career
Born and raised in Syracuse, New York, Collins graduated from Corcoran High School and played college basketball at New Mexico State University under head coach Lou Henson. As a senior, Collins was the captain of an Aggie squad that reached the 1970 Final Four.

Collins was then drafted in the first round of the 1970 NBA draft by the Chicago Bulls.

Coaching career
Collins began his coaching career with one and a half years as a graduate assistant at New Mexico State after retiring from professional basketball. In 1976, Collins returned to Chicago to start a trucking business. From 1977 to 1983, Collins was a probation officer for Cook County, Illinois. Collins also returned to coaching in 1980 as volunteer head coach at St. Thomas Elementary School in Chicago.

From 1983 to 1996, Collins was an assistant at the University of Illinois at Urbana-Champaign (Illinois) under Lou Henson. There he had made a name for himself as one of the nation's best recruiters, helping lure Chicago area players such as Kendall Gill, Nick Anderson, Deon Thomas and the bulk of the Fighting Illini's 1989 Final Four team.

In 1996, Collins became head coach at the University of Illinois at Chicago (UIC). In 14 seasons, Collins had a 218–208 record, including three NCAA Tournament appearances in 1998, 2002, and 2004. On July 20, 2010, Collins announced his retirement from coaching.

Collins died on December 13, 2020 at age 74.

Head coaching record

Notes

External links
NBA career stats

1946 births
2020 deaths
African-American basketball players
African-American basketball coaches
All-American college men's basketball players
American men's basketball players
Basketball coaches from New York (state)
Basketball players from Syracuse, New York
Chicago Bulls draft picks
Chicago Bulls players
Illinois Fighting Illini men's basketball coaches
New Mexico State Aggies men's basketball coaches
New Mexico State Aggies men's basketball players
Shooting guards
UIC Flames men's basketball coaches
20th-century African-American sportspeople
21st-century African-American people